Telerik AD (Телерик АД) is a Bulgarian company offering software tools for web, mobile, desktop application development, tools and subscription services for cross-platform application development. Founded in 2002 as a company focused on .NET development tools, Telerik now also sells a platform for web, hybrid and native app development.

On October 22, 2014 Progress Software announced its acquisition of Telerik. The acquisition was finalized on December 1, 2014.

Overview 

Telerik was founded in 2002 by four graduates of American University in Bulgaria and Technical University of Sofia. Initially focused on providing outsourced software development for foreign and Bulgarian companies, the company shifted its direction to the creation of application development tools. Its first product, RAD editor (rapid application development), was a web page editor designed to support the then recently launched Microsoft technology, ASP.NET. The company then expanded its offerings to include user interface (UI) navigation controls, and the Telerik Sitefinity content management system a few years later.
Based upon developer interaction, Telerik developed tools targeted to support other .NET technologies, such as ASP.NET AJAX, ASP.NET MVC, WPF, Silverlight and Windows/Windows Phone. Telerik introduced support for HTML5 and JavaScript in 2011 with its Kendo UI product, coinciding with expected industry growth in mobile adoption.

Growth 

Company growth came by way of hiring in Bulgaria, as well as expansion and acquisition abroad:
 2008 Germany: Acquired Vanatec GmbH, an enterprise-grade ORM provider 
 2010 USA: Merged with ArtOfTest, adding the Test Studio product
 2010 Canada: Acquired TeamPulse, via a partnership deal with Imaginet
 2011 UK and Australia: Expansion
 2012 USA: Acquired Fiddler, a web debugging proxy
 2013 Denmark: Acquired EQATEC Analytics, a software analytics suite
As of 2013, Telerik has 800 employees in 11 offices, led by co-CEOs Vasil Terziev and Svetozar Georgiev, and Chief Product Officer Aaron Mahimainathan.

On October 22, 2014 Progress Software announced its acquisition of Telerik, for $262.5 million.

Products and technologies 

Telerik is known for its .NET user interface controls, but through acquisition and invention, expanded to support additional areas of the software development lifecycle:

Controls Suite 

 DevCraft: A collection of UI controls and widgets with versions for use with applications developed on the .NET platform (ASP.NET AJAX, ASP.NET MVC and WPF), HTML5 (Kendo UI) or through Xamarin for mobile devices.

Cloud development 

 Telerik Platform: An integrated group of SaaS  products that together provide the ability to plan, develop, deploy and measure cross-platform and mobile applications via the cloud. On 10 May 2018, Telerik Platform will be retired.

Application lifecycle management 

 TeamPulse: An agile development project management tool
 Test Studio: A tool that helps software developers implement testing protocols.

Content management 

 Sitefinity: A web content management system (CMS), used to create and manage websites accessed via desktop or mobile devices.

Open-Source software products 

For most of its products, Telerik takes a proprietary approach to its development process. However, it also has several products that are free and open source: NativeScript, Kendo UI Core, Data Access, Just Decompile and the “Sitefinity Project Feather” Initiative.

References

External links 
 
 Sitefinity

Progress Software
Android (operating system) development software
Companies established in 2002
Defunct software companies of Bulgaria
Mobile software programming tools
Software companies based in Massachusetts